Ultimate Fight Night 3 was a mixed martial arts event held by the Ultimate Fighting Championship on January 16, 2006. The event took place at the Hard Rock Hotel and Casino in Las Vegas, Nevada, and was broadcast live on Spike TV in the United States and Canada. The main event between Tim Sylvia and Assuerio Silva was touted as a match to determine the next contender for the UFC Heavyweight Championship, then held by Andrei Arlovski.  The two-hour broadcast drew a 1.7 overall rating.  The disclosed fighter payroll for Ultimate Fight Night 3 was $183,000.

During the broadcast, UFC President Dana White announced a bout between Matt Hughes and Royce Gracie, which later occurred at UFC 60.


Results

Bonus awards

Fight of the Night: Melvin Guillard vs. Josh Neer

Reported payouts

Tim Sylvia: $80,000 

Stephan Bonnar: $24,000 

Jason Von Flue: $10,000 

Josh Burkman: $10,000 

Chris Leben: $10,000

Duane Ludwig: $8,000

Assuerio Silva: $8,000 

Spencer Fisher: $8,000

Drew Fickett: $6,000 

James Irvin: $5,000 

Jorge Rivera: $5,000 

Alex Karalexis: $3,000 

Aaron Riley: $3,000 

Jonathan Goulet: $3,000 

Disclosed Fighter Payroll: $183,000

See also
 Ultimate Fighting Championship
 List of UFC champions
 List of UFC events
 2006 in UFC

References

External links
Fight Night 3 Results on Sherdog

UFC Fight Night
2006 in mixed martial arts
Mixed martial arts in Las Vegas
2006 in sports in Nevada
Hard Rock Hotel and Casino (Las Vegas)